This is a list of data types of the Standard Libraries as defined in the ECMA-335 standard. Implementations of the Common Language Infrastructure must define the types of the standard in their respective standard libraries. The standard encourages implementers to extend or to modify the types specified in the standard to provide additional functionality.

List

Base Class Library

Runtime Infrastructure Library

Network Library

Reflection Library

XML Library

Extended Array Library
The Extended Array Library provides support for non-vector arrays. That is, arrays that have more than one dimension or
arrays that have non-zero lower bounds. The Extended Array Library doesn't add any extra types, but it does extend the array-handling mechanism.

Extended Numerics Library

Parallel Library

Vararg Library

References

External links
Ecma International, Standard ECMA-335, Common Language Infrastructure (CLI), 6th edition (June 2012)
Ecma International, Technical Report TR/84, Common Language Infrastructure (CLI) - Information Derived from Partition IV XML File, 6th edition (June 2012)

Common Language Infrastructure